Oskar Georg Fischbach (14 December 1880 – 1967) was a German lawyer and civil servant who was involved in drafting the civil service law at the end of the Weimar Republic and various official laws of Nazi Germany.

Life

Oskar Georg Fischbach was born in Strasbourg, then in Germany, on 14 December 1880.
He gained a doctorate of Law in Strasbourg in 1907. 
In 1915 he was appointed to the District Court of Strasbourg.
Fischbach became a civil servant in the Reich Treasury, then in the Reich Ministry of Finance. 
He became a member of the Nazi Party in May 1933, and was a member of the subcommittee on Civil Service Law of Hans Frank's Academy for German Law. 
He worked on drafts of the Nazi laws, including the German Civil Service act of 1937.
In 1945 he was appointed the last president of the National Debt Office, succeeding Ernst Articus.

After World War II (1939–45) the arbitration board of the Greater Berlin Magistrature rejected his denazification. 
However, the American military government allowed his denazification as a so-called follower.
He became an author, and during the early years of the German Federal Republic commented on the new Federal Civil Service Act.
He died in 1967.

Publications

Notes

Sources

External links
 

1880 births
1967 deaths
Lawyers in the Nazi Party
Members of the Academy for German Law
People from Strasbourg
20th-century German civil servants
20th-century German lawyers